Nueva Chicago can mean:
 the Mataderos barrio of Buenos Aires, which is also called Nueva Chicago, or
 the Club Atlético Nueva Chicago football club, which is based there

See also
New Chicago (disambiguation)